Jürgen Hönscheid (born 1954, in Sylt) is a German windsurfer. He became the vice world champion in tandem windsurfing in 1974, setting a land speed record in 1981; was a founding member of the Professional Windsurfers Association in 1982, and has authored several books on the subject including Heavy weather windsurfing : on funboards and sinkers (1984), Brandungssurfen (1985), and Mein Arbeitgeber ist der Wind 50 Jahre Surf- und Windsurfgeschichte(n) (2008).

Literary works

References 

1954 births
Living people
German surfers
Windsurfers
People from Sylt